Hire a Man is a 2016 Nigerian romantic comedy film directed by Desmond Elliot and produced by Chinneylove Eze. The film stars the Ghanaian actress Zynnell Zuh and Nollywood actors and actresses such as Enyinna Nwigwe, IK Ogbonna, Nancy Isime, Bayray McNwizu and Daniel Lloyd. The movie portrays the pressure put on ladies to get married when age begins to step in, by the society.

Production
The film was produced by Chinneylove Eze Productions Ltd.

Plot
In the movie, after the wedding engagement announcement by her younger, prettier and skinnier sister, Tinu (Nancy Isime), the spoilt rich successful accountant, Tishe Lawson (Zynnell Zuh), hires Jeff (Enyinna Nwigwe) to pretend to be her fiancé. The showdown stage just got ready!

Cast
 Zynnell Zuh as Tishe Lawson
 Enyinna Nwigwe as Jeff
 IK Ogbonna
 Nancy Isime as Tinu
 Bayray McNwizu as Sonnia
 Daniel Lloyd
 Shaffy Bello as Tishe's and Tinu's mother
 Keppy Ekpenyong Bassey as Tishe's and Tinu's father
 Desmond Elliot

Release
The movie was released on 10 February 2016 and was announced to be premiered in cinemas throughout Nigeria by 24 February 2017.

References

External links
 Hire a Man (2017) on IMDb
 Hire a Man (2017) on NMDb
 Hire a Man on Nlist
 Chinneylove Eze Production

2016 films
2016 romantic comedy films
English-language Nigerian films
2010s English-language films
Nigerian romantic comedy films